Aurora Degree College is a degree college located in Chikkadpally, Hyderabad, India. It is affiliated to Osmania University.
The college offers a wide variety of courses in humanities, commerce and science streams. It is known as one of the degree colleges in the city.
The college has 2 campuses, one at Chikkadpally and other at RTC X Roads

Courses 
 BA ( Mass communication, Political science, Modern language)
 BA( Mass communication, History, Geography)
 B.COM ( Computers)
 B.COM (Hons.)
 B.COM (General)
 BBA (Regular)
 BSC (Maths)
 BSC (Physics)
 BSC (Chemistry)

Student Activities 
 Theatre Club
 Entrepreneurship development Club
 Sports Club
 Quiz Club
 Cultural Club
 Literary Club
 Mass communication Club

History 
The college was established in 1992.

References

Universities and colleges in Hyderabad, India
1992 establishments in Andhra Pradesh
Educational institutions established in 1992